Fire, also known as No Escapes is a 2020 Russian disaster film directed by Aleksey Nuzhnyy. A heroic story about firefighters and rescuers of the Aerial Forest Protection Service "Avialesookhrana" and the Ministry of Emergency Situations, who resist the merciless elements and turn out to be the only hope of people in trouble. The film includes real footage of terrible forest fires in the Krasnoyarsk Territory.

It was theatrically released in Russia on December 24, 2020 by Central Partnership. The film grossed over 926.8 million rubles compared to a production budget of 550 million rubles and was crowned a commercial success.

Plot 
The film tells about firefighters and rescuers who stand in the way of a cruel element.

Cast

Production 
The film was shot by Nikita Mikhalkov's Studio TriTe in collaboration with VGTRK Corporation and the television channel Russia-1, distributed by Central Partnership and supported by the Government Russian Cinema Fund.

Filming 
Principal photography began from May to September 2019 in the Republic of Karelia forests and the Moscow Oblast, in the city of Taganrog, Rostov Oblast, in the city of Vsevolozhsk, Leningrad Oblast, and in the city of Vladimir, Vladimir Oblast. The film crew was consulted by specialists from the MChS and the Aerial Forest Protection Service in Siberia, who also provided unique air transport: Mil Mi-8 helicopters participated in the filming, Ilyushin Il-62, Antonov An-26 aircraft and multipurpose Beriev Be-200.

The ground photographs were taken by real rescuers and firefighters from the MChS and the Federal Agency for Forestry's Aerial Forest Protection Service. The scene of extinguishing a forest fire, in which the Beriev Be-200 seaplane was involved, was filmed simultaneously with six cameras.

Release 
It was released in the Russian Federation on December 24, 2020 by Central Partnership.

References

External links 
 

2020 films
2020s Russian-language films
2020s disaster films
2020s adventure drama films
Russian disaster films
Russian adventure drama films
Films about firefighting
Films about wildfires
Films set in Russia
Films set in Siberia
Films set in forests
Films shot in Russia
IMAX films
Films produced by Nikita Mikhalkov